is a Japanese professional footballer who plays as a forward for Japan Football League club, ReinMeer Aomori.

Career 
After graduating at Meiji University, Kido signed for Avispa Fukuoka in October 2017.

On 2 January 2021, Kido joined J2 club Montedio Yamagata ahead of the 2021 season. On 24 November 2022, it was announced that he would not be having his contract renewed by Yamagata.

On 23 January 2023, Kido officially joined ReinMeer Aomori ahead of the 2023 season.

Career statistics

Club 
Updated to the start from 2023 season.

References

External links

Profile at J. League
Profile at Montedio Yamagata

1995 births
Living people
Association football people from Chiba Prefecture
Japanese footballers
J2 League players
Japan Football League players
Avispa Fukuoka players
Montedio Yamagata players
ReinMeer Aomori players
Association football forwards